Kostas Pantelidis (born 11 November 1985, in Athens) is a Greek professional darts player who competes in British Darts Organisation. He has qualified for the 2016 BDO World Darts Championship.

Career

General
In May 2011 Kostas won the Greek National Championships and the Mediterranean Cup. In 2014 he won the Hellinikon Open, beating John Michael in the final. He qualified for the 2016 BDO World Darts Championship, beating Darren Peetoom in England 3–2 in the preliminary round before losing his first round match 3–1 to number 8 seed Geert De Vos in Belgium. Kostas won the 2019 Greek National Championships.

World Championship results

BDO
 2016: 1st Round (lost to Geert De Vos 1–3)

References

External links
 Kostas Pantelidis on Darts Database
 Kostas Pantelidis on Facebook

Living people
1985 births
Greek darts players
British Darts Organisation players
Sportspeople from Athens